opened in 1992 in Kōriyama, Fukushima Prefecture, Japan. The collection includes works by Thomas Gainsborough, John Constable, J. M. W. Turner, Edward Burne-Jones, and John William Waterhouse, as well as Japanese artists Shiba Kōkan, Takahashi Yuichi, Fujishima Takeji, and Kishida Ryūsei. The museum also includes works by artists associated with Kōriyama.

See also
 Fukushima Prefectural Museum of Art
 List of Cultural Properties of Japan - paintings (Fukushima)

References

External links

  Kōriyama City Museum of Art
  Kōriyama City Museum of Art Collection Database

Museums in Fukushima Prefecture
Kōriyama
Art museums and galleries in Japan
Museums established in 1992
1992 establishments in Japan